East Baton Rouge Parish is the most populous parish in the U.S. state of Louisiana. Its population was 456,781 at the 2020 census. The parish seat is Baton Rouge, Louisiana's state capital. East Baton Rouge Parish is located within the Greater Baton Rouge area.

Geography

Bodies of water
 Amite River
 Bayou Manchac
 Comite River
 Mississippi River
 Thompson Creek

Major highways

  Interstate 10
  Interstate 12
  Interstate 110
  U.S. Highway 61
  U.S. Highway 190

Adjacent parishes
 East Feliciana Parish (north)
 West Feliciana Parish (northwest)
 West Baton Rouge Parish (west)
 Iberville Parish (south)
 Ascension Parish (southeast)
 Livingston Parish (east)
 St. Helena Parish (northeast)

Communities

Cities 
 Baker
 Baton Rouge (parish seat and largest municipality)
 Central
 Zachary

Census-designated places 
 Brownfields
 Gardere
 Inniswold
 Merrydale
 Monticello
 Oak Hills Place
 Old Jefferson
 Shenandoah
 Village St. George
 Westminster

Unincorporated communities 
 Baywood
 Greenwell Springs
 Port Hudson
 Pride

Demographics

As of the 2020 United States census, there were 456,781 people, 161,536 households, and 95,243 families residing in the parish. The 2019 American Community Survey estimated 443,763 people lived in East Baton Rouge, up from 440,171 at the 2010 United States census. Of the population, 5.7% were foreign-born, and 8.3% spoke a language other than English at home. There were 164,346 households and 45,760 businesses operating in the parish.

At the 2019 census estimates, the racial and ethnic makeup of East Baton Rouge Parish was 46.8% non-Hispanic white, 46.1% Black and African American, 0.2% American Indian and Alaska Native, 3.2% Asian alone, 1.8% some other race, and 1.9% two or more races; Hispanic and Latin Americans of any race made up 4.2% of the total population.
In 2010, the racial and ethnic makeup of the parish was 45.9% Black and African American, 49.5% White American, 0.3% American Indian and Alaska Native, 3.0% Asian, 0.12% Pacific Islander, 1.02% from other races, and 1.2% from two or more races. About 3.8% of the population were Hispanic or Latin American of any race.

Of the 164,346 households at the 2019 American Community Survey, there were 6.6% of people aged 5 and under; 77.2% were aged 18 and older, and 13.7% were 65 and older. The median age of East Baton Rouge was 34, up from 32 at the 2010 U.S. census. In 2010, for every 100 females, there were 91.90 males. For every 100 females age 18 and over, there were 87.50 males.

In the parish, the median household income was $54,948 and there were 194,326 housing units. East Baton Rouge Parish had a home-ownership rate of 59.8%, and the median value of an owner-occupied housing unit was $194,000. The median gross rent for residents was $933. Males had a median income of $55,862 versus $38,817 for females.

An estimated 61.2% of the parish was employed, and of the 45,760 businesses, 19,537 were minority-owned. Veteran-owned businesses numbered approximately 4,637.

Education

Primary and secondary education
Most sections of the parish are zoned to schools in East Baton Rouge Parish School System. Baker residents attend the City of Baker School System. Zachary residents and residents of unincorporated areas around Zachary attend the Zachary Community School Board. Central residents, and those of a section of Brownfields, as well as some other unincorporated areas, attend the Central Community School System schools.

The State of Louisiana also operates the Louisiana School for the Visually Impaired and Louisiana School for the Deaf.

The Roman Catholic Diocese of Baton Rouge operates Catholic parochial schools.

Other education
East Baton Rouge Parish Library is the public library system. The parish is in the service area of Baton Rouge Community College.

Government
The city of Baton Rouge and the Parish of East Baton Rouge have been run by a consolidated government since 1947, which combined the city of Baton Rouge government with the rural areas of the parish. The city and parish are served by the metropolitan council and the mayor-president.

The parish courthouse in Baton Rouge is one of 26 public buildings constructed by  contractor George A. Caldwell in the 1930s.

In 2010, the 19th Judicial District Court moved into the new courthouse on North Blvd.

The Jetson Center for Youth, a former juvenile prison operated by the Louisiana Office of Juvenile Justice, is located near Baker in an unincorporated area.

Politics
Since 1980, East Baton Rouge Parish has been a bellwether in presidential elections, voting for the winner of the presidency in all but two elections (it voted for George H. W. Bush in 1992 and Hillary Clinton in 2016), but not necessarily the winner of Louisiana. In the 2008 presidential election, the parish voted for Democrat Barack Obama, who won 51% of the vote and 99,652 votes. Republican John McCain won 48% of the votes and 95,390 votes. In the 2008 Senate election, Democrat Mary Landrieu, who kept her seat as a U.S Senator, won 57% of the vote and 110,694 votes in East Baton Rouge Parish. Republican John Neely Kennedy won 41% of the vote and 80,222 votes. In the 2004 presidential election, East Baton Rouge Parish cast the majority of its votes for Republican George W. Bush, who won 54% of the votes and 99,943 votes. Democrat John F. Kerry won 45% of the votes and 82,298 votes.

In 2016, John Kennedy lost East Baton Rouge Parish in his otherwise highly successful U.S. Senate race against Democratic Louisiana Public Service Commissioner Foster Campbell, who prevailed 52-48%. By a nearly identical margin, Democrat Sharon Weston Broome defeated Republican Bodi White to claim the Baton Rouge mayor-president position to succeed Democrat Kip Holden.

Law enforcement
The East Baton Rouge Parish Sheriff's Office employs approximately 850 deputies, making it one of the largest law enforcement agencies in the state of Louisiana. Notable past sheriffs include politician Philemon Thomas; baseball player Terry Felton became a captain in the department after retiring from sports.

Other law enforcement agencies in the parish include:
 Baton Rouge Police Department
 Baton Rouge City Constable (Ward 1)
 Baton Rouge Metropolitan Airport Police Department
 Baker Police Department
 Baker City Marshall
 Zachary Police Department
 City of Central Police Department
 Louisiana State University Police Department
 Baton Rouge Community College Police Department
 Southern University Police Department
 East Baton Rouge Parish Constable - Ward 2, District 1
 East Baton Rouge Parish Constable - Ward 2, District 2
 East Baton Rouge Parish Constable - Ward 2, District 3
 East Baton Rouge Parish Constable - Ward 3, District 1
 East Baton Rouge Parish Constable - Ward 3, District 2
 East Baton Rouge Parish Constable - Ward 3, District 3

National Guard
The 769th Engineer Battalion (Combat) a unit of the 225th Engineer Brigade is located in East Baton Rouge Parish. Two companies of this battalion deployed to Iraq in 2007–2008.  Another company-sized unit, the 927TH Sapper Company, deployed to Afghanistan in 2008–2009.  As of 2011, yet another company, the 926TH Mobility Augmentation Company located in Baker has been alerted for overseas deployment. The 769th Engineers have two other companies, the 922nd Horizontal Engineer Company located in Gonzales, Louisiana, and the 928th Sapper Company located in Napoleonville, Louisiana.

Healthcare and Emergency Medical Services 
Major Hospitals include

 Baton Rouge General Bluebonnet
 Baton Rouge General Mid-City
 Ochsner Medical Center - Baton Rouge
 Our Lady of the Lake Regional Medical Center
 Our Lady of the Lake Children's Hospital
 Woman's Hospital

Emergency Medical Services in EBR Parish are provided by East Baton Rouge EMS and Acadian Ambulance.

See also

 National Register of Historic Places listings in East Baton Rouge Parish, Louisiana

References

External links
 Baton Rouge City and Parish government's website
 Visit Baton Rouge
 Explore the History and Culture of Southeastern Louisiana, a National Park Service Discover Our Shared Heritage Travel Itinerary

 
Louisiana parishes
Baton Rouge metropolitan area
Louisiana parishes on the Mississippi River
1812 establishments in Louisiana
Populated places established in 1812
Majority-minority parishes in Louisiana